In the United States, human rights comprise a series of rights which are legally protected by the Constitution of the United States (particularly the Bill of Rights), state constitutions, treaty and customary international law, legislation enacted by Congress and state legislatures, and state referendums and citizen's initiatives. The Federal Government has, through a ratified constitution, guaranteed unalienable rights to its citizens and (to some degree) non-citizens. These rights have evolved over time through constitutional amendments, legislation, and judicial precedent. Along with the rights themselves, the portion of the population granted these rights has expanded over time. Within the United States, federal courts have jurisdiction over international human rights laws.

The United States has generally been given high to fair marks on human rights. For example, the Freedom in the World index (based in the U.S.) lists the United States in the highest category for human freedom in civil and political rights, with 83 out of 100 points as of 2021. The Press Freedom Index, published by Reporters Without Borders, ranks the U.S. 42nd out of 180 countries with a score of 72.74 out of 100 as of 2022, with lower scores indicating worse press freedom. The Democracy Index, published by the Economist Intelligence Unit, described the United States as a "flawed democracy," with a score of 7.85 out of 10, making it the 26th most democratic country in the world as of 2021. The Human Rights Measurement Initiative finds that the United States performs worse than average for Quality of Life, Safety from the State, and Empowerment rights compared to other high-income countries.

Despite the fair to high rankings in reports on human rights, the United States also receives significant domestic and international criticism for its human rights record. Much of the criticism is directed at the existence of systemic racism, gender violence and abortion bans, weaker labor protections than most western countries, imprisonment of debtors, criminalization of homelessness and poverty, invasion of its citizens' privacy through mass surveillance programs, police brutality, police impunity and corruption, incarceration of citizens for profit, mistreatment of prisoners, the highest number of juveniles in the prison system of any country, some of the longest prison sentences in the world, continued use of the death penalty despite its abolition in nearly all other western countries, abuse of both legal and illegal immigrants (including children), the facilitation of state terrorism, a health care system favoring profit via privatization over the wellbeing of citizens, the lack of a universal health care program unlike most other developed countries, one of the most expensive and worst-performing health care systems of any developed country, continued support for foreign dictators (even when genocide has been committed), forced disappearances, extraordinary renditions, extrajudicial detentions, the torture of prisoners at Guantanamo Bay and black sites, and extrajudicial targeted killings (e.g. the Disposition Matrix).

History

The first human rights organization in the Thirteen Colonies of British America, dedicated to the abolition of slavery, was formed by Anthony Benezet in 1775. A year later, the Declaration of Independence announced that the Thirteen Colonies regarded themselves as independent states, and no longer a part of the British Empire. The Declaration stated "that all men are created equal, that they are endowed by their Creator with certain unalienable Rights, that among these are Life, Liberty and the pursuit of Happiness", echoing John Locke's phrase "life, liberty, and property". This view of human liberties, which originated from the European Age of Enlightenment, postulates that fundamental rights are not granted by a divine or supernatural being to monarchs who then grant them to subjects, but are granted by a divine or supernatural being to each man (but not woman) and are inalienable and inherent.

After the Revolutionary War, the former thirteen colonies went through a pre-government phase of more than a decade, with much debate about the form of government they would have. The United States Constitution, adopted in 1787 through ratification at a national convention and conventions in the colonies, created a republic that guaranteed several rights and civil liberties. However, it did not extend voting rights in the United States beyond white male property owners (about 6% of the population). The Constitution referred to "Persons", not "Men" as was used in the Declaration of Independence. It also omitted any reference to terms such as a "Creator" or "God" and any authority derived or divined therefrom, and allowed "affirmation" in lieu of an "oath" if preferred. The Constitution guaranteed rights and provided that they belonged to all Persons (presumably meaning men and women, and perhaps children, although the developmental distinction between children and adults poses issues and has been the subject of subsequent amendments, as discussed below). Some of this conceptualization may have arisen from the significant Quaker segment of the population in the colonies, especially in the Delaware Valley, and their religious views that all human beings, regardless of sex, age, race, or other characteristics, had the same Inner light. Quaker and Quaker-derived views would have informed the drafting and ratification of the Constitution, including the direct influence of  some of the Framers of the Constitution, such as John Dickinson and Thomas Mifflin, who were either Quakers themselves or came from regions which were either founded or heavily populated by Quakers.

Dickinson, Mifflin and other Framers who objected to slavery were outvoted on that question, however, and the original Constitution sanctioned slavery (although it was not based on either the race or any other characteristic of the slave) and, through the Three-Fifths Compromise, it counted slaves (who were not defined by race) as three-fifths of a Person for purposes of distribution of taxes and representation in the House of Representatives (although the slaves themselves were discriminated against in voting for such representatives).

As the new Constitution took effect in practice, concerns about individual liberties and the concentration of power at the federal level, gave rise to the amendment of the Constitution through the adoption of the Bill of Rights, the first ten amendments to the Constitution. However, this had little impact on judgements by the courts for the first 130 years after its ratification.

Courts and legislatures also began to vary in the interpretation of "Person", with some jurisdictions narrowing the meaning of "Person" to cover only people with property, only men, or only white men.  For example, although women had been voting in some states, such as New Jersey, since the founding of the United States, and prior to that in the colonial era, other states denied them the vote.  In 1756 Lydia Chapin Taft voted, casting a vote in the local town hall meeting in place of her deceased husband. In 1777 women lost the right to exercise their vote in New York, in 1780 women lost the right to exercise their vote in Massachusetts, and in 1784 women lost the right to exercise their vote in New Hampshire.
From 1775 until 1807, the state constitution in New Jersey permitted all persons worth over fifty pounds (about $7,800 adjusted for inflation, with the election laws referring to the voters as "he or she") to vote; provided they had this property, free black men and single women regardless of race therefore had the vote until 1807, but not married women, who could have no independent claim to ownership of fifty pounds (anything they owned or earned belonged to their husbands by the Common law of Coverture).  In 1790, the law was revised to specifically include women, but in 1807 the law was again revised to exclude them, an unconstitutional act since the state constitution specifically made any such change dependent on the general suffrage.  See Women's suffrage in the United States.  Through the doctrine of coverture, many states also denied married women the right to own property in their own name, although most allowed single women (widowed, divorced or never married) the "Person" status of men, sometimes pursuant to the common law concept of a femme sole.   Over the years, a variety of claimants sought to assert that discrimination against women in voting, in property ownership, in occupational license, and other matters was unconstitutional given the Constitution's use of the term "Person", but the all-male courts did not give this fair hearing.  See, e.g., Bradwell v. Illinois.

In the 1860s, after decades of conflict over southern states' continued practice of slavery, and northern states' outlawing it, the Civil War was fought, and in its aftermath the Constitution was amended to prohibit slavery and to prohibit states' denying rights granted in the Constitution.  Among these amendments was the Fourteenth Amendment, which included an Equal Protection Clause which seemed to clarify that courts and states were prohibited in narrowing the meaning of "Persons".  After the Fourteenth Amendment to the United States Constitution was adopted, Susan B. Anthony, buttressed by the equal protection language, voted.  She was prosecuted for this, however, and ran into an all-male court ruling that women were not "Persons"; the court levied a fine but it was never collected.

Fifty years later, in 1920, the Constitution was amended again, with the Nineteenth Amendment to definitively prohibit discrimination against women's suffrage.

In the 1970s, the Burger Court made a series of rulings clarifying that discrimination against women in the status of being Persons violated the Constitution and acknowledged that previous court rulings to the contrary had been Sui generis and an abuse of power.  The most often cited of these is Reed v. Reed, which held that any discrimination against either sex in the rights associated with Person status must meet a strict scrutiny standard.

The 1970s also saw the adoption of the Twenty-sixth Amendment, which prohibited discrimination on the basis of age, for Persons 18 years old and over, in voting.  Other attempts to address the developmental distinction between children and adults in Person status and rights have been addressed mostly by the Supreme Court, with the Court recognizing in 2012, in Miller v. Alabama a political and biological principle that children are different from adults.

In 1945 the members of the United Nations organization completed the drafting of its founding text – the United Nations charter: The USA played a significant role in this process.

The Universal Declaration of Human Rights Drafting Committee was chaired by former First Lady Eleanor Roosevelt, who was known for her human rights advocacy. Similarly, for the United States government and its citizens, much remained uncertain about the future impact, force, and reach of international human rights. Eventually the United States had not yet developed a policy approach regarding whether or not it would recognize international human rights within a domestic context. Certainly there were already some domestic political attempts, as for example President Truman's Committee on Civil rights, which authored a report in 1947 initializing the possibility to apply the UN charter in order to combat racial discrimination in the US. Now that the United States had successfully adopted the UDHR, obviously it seemed like human rights would play a leading part in domestic law within the US. Still there was harsh controversy over the question whether to apply international law on the inner-land-basis. William H. Fitzpatrick won the Pulitzer Prize for editorial writing in 1951 for his editorials that repeatedly warned against international human rights overthrowing the supreme law of the land. Indeed, Fitzpatrick's concerns and motivations – as well as those of his readers – stood for the longstanding, bitter social and political struggles that divided much of the United States at the time, keeping in mind that in the 1940s and 1950s racial divisions, political exclusion, and gender inequalities were basic facts of American social life.

However, today there is little worry in the United States about the effect that human rights might have on its domestic law. Over the past few decades, the United States government has often held itself up as a strong supporter of human rights in the international arena. Nonetheless, in the view of the government human rights are still an international rather than a domestic phenomenon – representing more of choice than obligation.

Having today overcome many of the inequalities from more than half a dozen decades before, still the United States is in violation of the Declaration, in as much that "everyone has the right to leave any country" because the government may prevent the entry and exit of anyone from the United States for foreign policy, national security, or child support rearage reasons by revoking their passport.  The United States is also in violation of the United Nations' human rights Convention on the Rights of the Child which requires both parents to have a relationship with the child.  Conflict between the human rights of the child and those of a mother or father who wishes to leave the country without paying child support or doing the personal work of child care for his child can be considered to be a question of negative and positive rights.

Legal framework

Domestic legal protection structure
According to Human Rights: The Essential Reference, "the American Declaration of Independence was the first civic document that met a modern definition of human rights." The Constitution recognizes a number of inalienable human rights, including freedom of speech, freedom of assembly, freedom of religion, the right to keep and bear arms, freedom from cruel and unusual punishment, and the right to a fair trial by jury.

Constitutional amendments have been enacted as the needs of the society evolved. The Ninth Amendment and Fourteenth Amendment recognized that not all human rights were enumerated in the original United States Constitution. The Civil Rights Act of 1964 and the Americans with Disabilities Act of 1990 are examples of human rights that were enumerated by Congress well after the Constitution's writing. The scope of the legal protections of human rights afforded by the US government is defined by case law, particularly by the precedent of the Supreme Court of the United States.

Within the federal government, the debate about what may or may not be an emerging human right is held in two forums: the United States Congress, which may enumerate these; and the Supreme Court, which may articulate rights that the law does not spell out. Additionally, individual states, through court action or legislation, have often protected human rights not recognized at federal level. For example, Massachusetts was the first of several states to recognize same sex marriage.

Effect of international treaties
In the context of human rights and treaties that recognize or create individual rights, U.S. constitutional law makes a distinction between self-executing and non-self-executing treaties. Non-self-executing treaties, which ascribe rights that under the constitution may be assigned by law, require legislative action to execute the contract (treaty) before it becomes a part of domestic law. There are also cases that explicitly require legislative approval according to the Constitution, such as cases that could commit the U.S. to declare war or appropriate funds.

Treaties regarding human rights, which create a duty to refrain from acting in a particular manner or confer specific rights, are generally held to be self-executing, requiring no further legislative action. In cases where legislative bodies refuse to recognize otherwise self-executing treaties by declaring them to be non-self-executing in an act of legislative non-recognition, constitutional scholars argue that such acts violate the separation of powersin cases of controversy, the judiciary, not Congress, has the authority under Article III to apply treaty law to cases before the court. This is a key provision in cases where the Congress declares a human rights treaty to be non-self-executing, for example, by contending it does not add anything to human rights under U.S. domestic law. The International Covenant on Civil and Political Rights is one such case, which, while ratified after more than two decades of inaction, was done so with reservations, understandings, and declarations.

Under the principle of pacta sunt servanda, a country may not invoke provisions of its domestic laws or constitution as justification for failure to comply with its international law obligations. Therefore, if a human rights treaty has been ratified by the U.S. but is not considered self-executing, or has not yet been implemented by legislation, it is nonetheless binding on the U.S. government as a matter of international law.

Equality

Racial

The Equal Protection Clause of the Fourteenth Amendment to the United States Constitution guarantees that "All persons born or naturalized in the United States ... are citizens of the United States and of the State wherein they reside. No State shall ... deny to any person within its jurisdiction the equal protection of the laws" In addition, Fifteenth Amendment to the United States Constitution prohibits the denial of a citizen of the right to vote based on that citizen's "race, color, or previous condition of servitude".

The United States has enacted comprehensive legislation prohibiting discrimination on the basis of race and national origin in the workplace in the Civil Rights Act of 1964 (CRA). The CRA is perhaps the most prominent civil rights legislation enacted in modern times, has served as a model for subsequent anti-discrimination laws and has greatly expanded civil rights protections in a wide variety of settings. The 1991 provision created recourse for victims of such discrimination for punitive damages and full back pay. In addition to individual civil recourse, the United States possesses anti-discrimination government enforcement bodies, such as the Equal Employment Opportunity Commission.

Beginning in 1965, the United States also began a program of affirmative action that not only obliges employers not to discriminate, but requires them to provide preferences for groups protected under the Civil Rights Act to increase their numbers where they are judged to be underrepresented. Such affirmative action programs are also applied in college admissions.

The United States also prohibits the imposition of any "... voting qualification or prerequisite to voting, or standard, practice, or procedure ... to deny or abridge the right of any citizen of the United States to vote on account of race or color," which prevents the use of grandfather clauses, literacy tests, poll taxes and white primaries.

Prior to the passage of the Thirteenth Amendment to the United States Constitution, slavery was legal in some states of the United States until 1865. Influenced by the principles of the Religious Society of Friends, Anthony Benezet formed the Pennsylvania Abolition Society in 1775, believing that all ethnic groups were considered equal and human slavery was incompatible with Christian beliefs. Benezet extended the recognition of human rights to Native Americans and argued for a peaceful solution to the violence between Native and European Americans. Benjamin Franklin became the president of Benezet's abolition society in the late 18th century. In addition, the Fourteenth Amendment was interpreted to permit what was termed Separate but equal treatment of minorities until the United States Supreme Court overturned this interpretation in 1954, which consequently overturned Jim Crow laws. Native Americans did not have citizenship rights until the Dawes Act of 1887 and the Indian Citizenship Act of 1924.

Following the 2008 presidential election, Barack Obama was sworn in as the first African-American president of the United States on January 20, 2009. In his Inaugural Address, President Obama stated "A man whose father less than 60 years ago might not have been served at a local restaurant can now stand before you to take a most sacred oath ... So let us mark this day with remembrance, of who we are and how far we have traveled".

Sex

The Nineteenth Amendment to the United States Constitution prohibits the states and the federal government from denying any citizen the right to vote because of that citizen's sex. While this does not necessarily guarantee all women the right to vote, as suffrage qualifications are determined by individual states, it does mean that states' suffrage qualifications may not prevent women from voting due to their gender.

The 1964 CRA prohibits discrimination on the basis of gender. A 1991 provision created recourse for discrimination victims for punitive damages and full back pay. The Equal Employment Opportunity Commission also provides recourse for workplace discrimination victims.

The United States has legally defined sexual harassment in the workplace. Because sexual harassment is therefore a Civil Rights violation, individual legal rights of those harassed in the workplace exist in the United States, though they often face skepticism and retaliation after speaking out.

The United States is one of only seven countries in the world that has not ratified the U.N. Convention on the Elimination of All Forms of Discrimination Against Women, known as CEDAW. An investigation by a UN Working Group on discrimination against women in law and practice associated with the Office of the UN High Commissioner for Human Rights (OHCHR) found that “The US, which is a leading State in formulating international human rights standards, is allowing its women to lag behind”.
 
According to the report of HRW, The patchwork of healthcare coverage in the Trump administration caused the loss of insurance for many women and girls who are at risk of deadly diseases such as gynecological cancer.

In June 2022, the U.S. Supreme Court eliminated the constitutional right to an abortion, allowing states to recriminalize the procedure. As of March 2023, 12 states have outlawed abortion, with several other state bans currently tied up in litigation. The majority of the bans have no exceptions for rape or incest. 1 in 3 American women currently live in states without abortion access. The decision received international condemnation.

The United States is the one of only six countries in the world that does not guarantee paid maternity leave to new mothers. A study of the 40 OECD countries ranked the United States the worst for paid maternity leave. 

The United States has the highest maternal mortality rate in the developed world, with a rate of nearly 33 maternal deaths per 100,000 live births. The rate rose nearly 40% in 2021 and has more than quadrupled since the 1990s.

1 in 4 American women experience domestic violence, with an average of 3 women killed by their intimate partners every day. Over half of female homicide victims in the United States are killed by their intimate partners. Domestic violence increased by 8% during the COVID-19 pandemic. Two-thirds of women killed by an intimate partner are killed with a gun. Existing loopholes in federal and state law allow access to guns by abusive partners and stalkers.

1 in 6 American women are victims of rape, with more than 600 rapes occurring in the United States every day. Only 25 out of 1,000 rapists serve jail time. Widespread rape in the U.S. military and on university campuses has received media attention, particularly due to routine cover-ups and retaliation against victims.

The United States has the highest female incarceration rate in the world, housing nearly one-third of the world's female prisoners. As many as 80% of female U.S. inmates have experienced physical and/or sexual abuse.

Disability

The United States has adopted antidiscrimination legislation for people with disabilities, the Americans with Disabilities Act of 1990 (ADA). The ADA reflected a dramatic shift toward the employment of persons with disabilities to enhance the labor force participation of qualified persons with disabilities and to reduce their dependence on government entitlement programs.   The ADA amends the CRA and permits plaintiffs to recover punitive damages. The ADA has been instrumental in the evolution of disability discrimination law in the United States. Although ADA Title I was found to be unconstitutional, the Supreme Court has extended the protection to people with Acquired immune deficiency syndrome (AIDS).

Federal benefits such as Social Security Disability Insurance (SSDI) and Supplemental Security Income (SSI) are often administratively viewed in the United States as being primarily or near-exclusively the entitlement only of impoverished U.S. people with disabilities, and not applicable to those with disabilities who make significantly above-poverty level income. This is proven in practice by the general fact that in the U.S., a disabled person on SSI without significant employment income who is suddenly employed, with a salary or wage at or above the living wage threshold, often discovers that government benefits they were previously entitled to have ceased, because supposedly the new job "invalidates" the need for this assistance. However, the Stephen Beck, Jr. Achieving a Better Life Experience Act of 2014 (the ABLE Act) amended Section 529 of the Internal Revenue Service Code of 1986 to create tax-free savings accounts (ABLE accounts) for qualified expenses, and with these accounts (each person may have only one account) people with disabilities who have a condition that occurred before age 26 can save up to $100,000 without risking eligibility for Social Security and other government programs. They can also keep their Medicaid coverage no matter how much money they accrue in their ABLE account. Under current gift-tax limitations as of 2014, as much as $14,000 could be deposited annually. However, each state must put regulations in place so that financial institutions can make the ABLE accounts available, and there is no guarantee a particular state will do so.

SSI benefits also require frequent reviews to "prove" the person is still disabled, and require the disabled person to be diligent about returning paperwork and reporting any income they make, raising concerns that it is unfair to people with disabilities, especially those with mental disabilities who are often unaware of how to navigate the complex bureaucracy needed to not lose their benefits, a situation not dissimilar to probation. The U.S. is the only industrialized country in the world to have this particular approach to disability assistance programming. These factors make it so that disabled people are in some senses second class citizens.

LGBTQ

The United States federal government voted in the United Nations General Assembly in favor of A/RES/57/214, A/RES/59/197, abstained A/RES/61/173, A/RES/63/182 A/RES/65/208, A/RES/67/168, and in favor of A/RES/69/182. The United States federal government also voted in favor of the United Nations Human Rights Council A/HRC/RES/17/19. The United States federal government signed the United Nations 2006 and 2008 Joint Statements. The United States federal government voted in the United Nations Security Council in favor of SC/12399.

Intersex

Intersex people in the United States have significant gaps in protections for physical integrity and bodily autonomy, particularly in protection from non-consensual cosmetic medical interventions and violence, and protection from discrimination. Actions by intersex civil society organizations aim to eliminate harmful practices, promote social acceptance, and equality. In recent years, intersex activists have also secured some forms of legal recognition.

Privacy

Privacy is not explicitly stated in the United States Constitution. In the Griswold v. Connecticut case, the Supreme Court ruled that it is implied in the Constitution. In the Roe v. Wade case, the Supreme Court used privacy rights to overturn most laws against abortion in the United States. In the Cruzan v. Director, Missouri Department of Health case, the Supreme Court held that the patient had a right of privacy to terminate medical treatment. In Gonzales v. Oregon, the Supreme Court held that the Federal Controlled Substances Act can not prohibit physician-assisted suicide allowed by the Oregon Death with Dignity Act. The Supreme Court upheld the constitutionality of criminalizing oral and anal sex in the Bowers v. Hardwick  decision; however, it overturned the decision in the Lawrence v. Texas  case and established the protection to sexual privacy.

Kate Ruane, senior legislative counsel for the First Amendment and consumer privacy at the American Civil Liberties Union declared that “We have these companies that are amassing just gigantic amounts of data about each and every one of us, all day, every day,” and  “Your data is being taken and it is being used in ways that are harmful.”

Edward Snowden’s document disclosed that "the federal government has routinely violated their right to privacy for more than a decade".

Accused
The United States maintains a presumption of innocence in legal procedures. The Fourth, Fifth, Sixth Amendment to the United States Constitution and Eighth Amendment to the United States Constitution deals with the rights of criminal suspects. Later the protection was extended to civil cases as well In the Gideon v. Wainwright case, the Supreme Court requires that indigent criminal defendants who are unable to afford their own attorney be provided counsel at trial. Since the Miranda v. Arizona case, the United States requires police departments to inform arrested persons of their rights, which is later called Miranda warning and typically begins with "You have the right to remain silent."

Freedoms

Freedom of religion

The Establishment Clause of the First Amendment prohibits the establishment of a national religion by Congress or the preference of one religion over another. The clause was used to limit school praying, beginning with Engel v. Vitale, which ruled government-led prayer unconstitutional. Wallace v. Jaffree banned moments of silence allocated for praying. The Supreme Court also ruled clergy-led prayer at public high school graduations unconstitutional with Lee v. Weisman.

The free exercise clause guarantees the free exercise of religion. The Supreme Court's Lemon v. Kurtzman decision established the "Lemon test" exception, which details the requirements for legislation concerning religion. In the Employment Division v. Smith decision, the Supreme Court maintained a "neutral law of general applicability" can be used to limit religion exercises. In the City of Boerne v. Flores decision, the Religious Freedom Restoration Act was struck down as exceeding congressional power; however, the decision's effect is limited by the Gonzales v. O Centro Espirita Beneficente Uniao do Vegetal decision, which requires states to express compelling interest in prohibiting illegal drug use in religious practices.

Freedom of expression

The United States is a constitutional republic based on founding documents that restrict the power of government and preserve the liberty of the people. The freedom of expression (including speech, media, and public assembly) is an important right and is given special protection, as declared by the First Amendment of the constitution. According to Supreme Court precedent, the federal and lower governments may not apply prior restraint to expression, with certain exceptions, such as national security and obscenity.  Legal limits on expression include:

Solicitation, fraud, specific threats of violence, or disclosure of classified information
Advocating the overthrow of the U.S. government through speech or publication, or organizing political parties that advocate the overthrow of the U.S. government (the Smith Act)
Civil offenses involving defamation, fraud, or workplace harassment
Copyright violations
Federal Communications Commission rules governing the use of broadcast media
Crimes involving sexual obscenity in pornography and text-only erotic stories.
Ordinances requiring mass demonstrations on public property to register in advance.
The use of free speech zones and protest free zones.
Military censorship of blogs written by military personnel claiming some include sensitive information ineligible for release. Some critics view military officials as trying to suppress dissent from troops in the field. The US Constitution specifically limits the human rights of active duty members, and this constitutional authority is used to limit speech rights by members in this and in other ways.

Some laws remain controversial due to concerns that they infringe on freedom of expression. These include the Digital Millennium Copyright Act and the Bipartisan Campaign Reform Act.

In two high-profile cases, grand juries have decided that Time magazine reporter Matthew Cooper and New York Times reporter Judith Miller must reveal their sources in cases involving CIA leaks. Time magazine exhausted its legal appeals, and Mr. Cooper eventually agreed to testify. Miller was jailed for 85 days before cooperating. U.S. District Chief Judge Thomas F. Hogan ruled that the First Amendment does not insulate Time magazine reporters from a requirement to testify before a criminal grand jury that's conducting the investigation into the possible illegal disclosure of classified information.

Approximately 30,000 government employees and contractors are currently employed to monitor telephone calls and other communications.

In November 2013, leaked documents revealed that the government and some large corporations had censored many blogs and news articles using existing surveillance programs.

Right to peaceably assemble

On May 4, 1970, Ohio National Guardsmen opened fire on protesting students at Kent State University, killing four students. Investigators determined that 28 Guardsmen fired 61 to 67 shots. The Justice Department concluded that the Guardsmen were not in danger and that their claim that they fired in self-defense was untrue. The nearest student was almost 100 yards away at the time of the shooting. Guards involved in the shooting were indicted. Eight of the guardsmen were indicted by a grand jury. The guardsmen claimed to have fired in self-defense, a claim that was generally accepted by the criminal justice system. In 1974 U.S. District Judge Frank Battisti dismissed charges against all eight on the basis that the prosecution's case was too weak to warrant a trial. Civil actions were also attempted against the guardsmen, the State of Ohio, and the president of Kent State. The federal court civil action for wrongful death and injury, brought by the victims and their families against Governor Rhodes, the President of Kent State, and the National Guardsmen, resulted in unanimous verdicts for all defendants on all claims after an eleven-week trial. The judgment on those verdicts was reversed by the Court of Appeals for the Sixth Circuit on the ground that the federal trial judge had mishandled an out-of-court threat against a juror. On remand, the civil case was settled in return for payment of a total of $675,000 to all plaintiffs by the State of Ohio.

Protesters have also been arrested for protesting outside of designated "free speech zones". At the 2004 Republican National Convention in New York City, over 1,700 protesters were arrested.

On July 24, 2020, the United Nations human rights office urged U.S. security forces to limit their use of force against peaceful protesters and journalists, as clashes between federal agents and demonstrators continued in Portland, Oregon.

Freedom of movement

As per § 707(b) of the Foreign Relations Authorization Act, Fiscal Year 1979, United States passports are required to enter and exit the country, and as per the Passport Act of 1926 and Haig v. Agee, the Presidential administration may deny or revoke passports for foreign policy or national security reasons at any time. Perhaps the most notable example of enforcement of this ability was the 1948 denial of a passport to U.S. Representative Leo Isacson, who sought to go to Paris to attend a conference as an observer for the American Council for a Democratic Greece, a Communist front organization, because of the group's role in opposing the Greek government in the Greek Civil War.

The United States prevents U.S. citizens to travel to Cuba, citing national security reasons, as part of an embargo against Cuba that has been condemned as an illegal act by the United Nations General Assembly. The current exception to the ban on travel to the island, permitted since April 2009, has been an easing of travel restrictions for Cuban-Americans visiting their relatives. Restrictions continue to remain in place for the rest of the American populace.

On June 30, 2010, the American Civil Liberties Union filed a lawsuit on behalf of ten people who are either U.S. citizens or legal residents of the U.S., challenging the constitutionality of the government's "no-fly" list. The plaintiffs have not been told why they are on the list. Five of the plaintiffs have been stranded abroad. It is estimated that the "no-fly" list contained about 8,000 names at the time of the lawsuit.

The Secretary of State can deny a passport to anyone imprisoned, on parole, or on supervised release for a conviction for international drug trafficking or sex tourism, or to anyone who is behind on their child support payments.

The following case precedents are typically incorrectly cited in defense of unencumbered travel within the United States:

"The use of the highway for the purpose of travel and transportation is not a mere privilege, but a common fundamental right of which the public and individuals cannot rightfully be deprived." Chicago Motor Coach v. Chicago, 337 Ill. 200; 169 N.E. 22 (1929).

"The right of the citizen to travel upon the public highways and to transport his property thereon, either by carriage or by automobile, is not a mere privilege which a city may prohibit or permit at will, but a common law right which he has under the right to life, liberty, and the pursuit of happiness." Thompson v. Smith, Supreme Court of Virginia, 155 Va. 367; 154 S.E. 579; (1930).

"Undoubtedly the right of locomotion, the right to move from one place to another according to inclination, is an attribute of personal liberty, and the right, ordinarily, of free transit from or through the territory of any State is a right secured by the 14th amendment and by other provisions of the Constitution." Schactman v. Dulles, 225 F.2d 938; 96 U.S. App. D.C. 287 (1955).

"The right to travel is a well-established common right that does not owe its existence to the federal government. It is recognized by the courts as a natural right." Schactman v. Dulles 225 F.2d 938; 96 U.S. App. D.C. 287 (1955) at 941.

"The right to travel is a part of the liberty of which the citizen cannot be deprived without due process of law under the Fifth Amendment." Kent v. Dulles, 357 US 116, 125 (1958).

Federal courts have ruled that a person does not have the right to drive an automobile, it is a privilege.

Right to vote

The right to vote, also known as the right to suffrage, is implicitly guaranteed through a combination of constitutional (especially the Fifteenth, Nineteenth and Twenty-fourth amendments), statutory and judicial guarantees. Unlike the United States Constitution, the right to vote is affirmatively guaranteed in 49 state constitutions, while the Arizona state constitution negatively affirms the right to vote. However, voting rights are impacted by the variety of state laws regarding voting and voter registration.

Freedom of association

Freedom of association is the right of individuals to come together in groups for political action or to pursue common interests.

Freedom of association in the U.S. is restricted by the Smith Act, which bans political parties that advocate the violent overthrow of the U.S. government.

Between 1956 and 1971, the FBI attempted to "expose, disrupt, misdirect, discredit, or otherwise neutralize" left-wing and indigenous groups through the COINTELPRO program.

In 2008, the Maryland State Police admitted that they had added the names of Iraq War protesters and death penalty opponents to a terrorist database. They also admitted that other "protest groups" were added to the terrorist database, but did not specify which groups. It was also discovered that undercover troopers used aliases to infiltrate organizational meetings, rallies and group e-mail lists. Police admitted there was "no evidence whatsoever of any involvement in violent crime" by those classified as terrorists.

Right of revolution

The right of revolution is the right or duty of the people of a nation to overthrow a government that acts against their common interests, and is a traditional assumption in American political thought. The right to revolution played a large part in the writings of the American revolutionaries in the run up to the American Revolution. The political tract Common Sense used the concept as an argument for rejection of the British Monarchy and separation from the British Empire, as opposed to merely self-government within it. It was also cited in the Declaration of Independence of the United States, when a group of representatives from the various states signed a declaration of independence citing charges against King George III. As the American Declaration of Independence in 1776 expressed it, natural law taught that the people were "endowed by their Creator with certain unalienable Rights" and could alter or abolish government "destructive" of those rights.

National security exceptions

The United States government has declared martial law, suspended (or claimed exceptions to) some rights on national security grounds, typically in wartime and conflicts such as the United States Civil War, Cold War or the War against Terror. 70,000 Americans of Japanese ancestry were legally interned during World War II under Executive Order 9066. In some instances the federal courts have allowed these exceptions, while in others the courts have decided that the national security interest was insufficient. Presidents Lincoln, Wilson, and F.D. Roosevelt ignored such judicial decisions.

Historical restrictions
Sedition laws have sometimes placed restrictions on freedom of expression. The Alien and Sedition Acts, passed by President John Adams during an undeclared naval conflict with France, allowed the government to punish "false" statements about the government and to deport "dangerous" immigrants. The Federalist Party used these acts to harass many supporters of the Democratic-Republican Party. While Woodrow Wilson was president, broad legislation called the Espionage Act of 1917 and Sedition Act of 1918 were passed during World War I. Thousands were jailed for violations of these laws, which prohibited criticizing conscription and the government, or sending literature through the US Mail doing the same. Most prominently it led to the conviction of Socialist Party of America Presidential candidate Eugene V. Debs for speaking out against US participation in World War I and conscription. Debs received ten years in prison, and ran for president a third time while in prison (on December 25, 1921, his sentence was commuted by President Warren G. Harding, releasing Debs early). Numerous conscientious objectors to conscription were also jailed, with a few dying due to mistreatment. In the post-war Palmer Raids, foreign-born dissidents were arrested in the thousands without legal warrants, and deported for their political beliefs.

Presidents have claimed the power to imprison summarily, under military jurisdiction, those suspected of being combatants for states or groups at war against the United States. Abraham Lincoln invoked this power in the American Civil War to imprison Maryland secessionists. In that case, the Supreme Court concluded that only Congress could suspend the writ of habeas corpus, and the government released the detainees. During World War II, the United States interned thousands of Japanese-Americans on alleged fears that Japan might use them as saboteurs-the US Supreme Court upheld this policy.

The Fourth Amendment of the United States Constitution forbids unreasonable search and seizure without a warrant, but some administrations have claimed exceptions to this rule to investigate alleged conspiracies against the government. During the Cold War, the Federal Bureau of Investigation established COINTELPRO to infiltrate and disrupt left-wing organizations, including those that supported the rights of black Americans.

National security, as well as other concerns like unemployment, has sometimes led the United States to toughen its generally liberal immigration policy. The Chinese Exclusion Act of 1882 all but banned Chinese immigrants, who were accused of crowding out American workers.

Nationwide Suspicious Activity Reporting Initiative
The federal government has set up a data collection and storage network that keeps a wide variety of data on tens of thousands of Americans who have not been accused of committing a crime. Operated primarily under the direction of the Federal Bureau of Investigation, the program is known as the Nationwide Suspicious Activity Reporting Initiative or SAR. Reports of suspicious behavior noticed by local law enforcement or by private citizens are forwarded to the program, and profiles are constructed of the persons under suspicion. See also Fusion Center.

Labor rights

Labor rights in the United States have been linked to basic constitutional rights. Comporting with the notion of creating an economy based upon highly skilled and high wage labor employed in a capital-intensive dynamic growth economy, the United States enacted laws mandating the right to a safe workplace, workers compensation, Unemployment insurance, fair labor standards, collective bargaining rights, Social Security, prohibiting child labor and guaranteeing a minimum wage.

During the 19th and 20th centuries, safer conditions and workers' rights were gradually mandated by law, but this trend has reversed to some extent towards pro-business policies since the 1980s.

In 1935, the National Labor Relations Act recognized and protected "the rights of most workers in the private sector to organize labor unions, to engage in collective bargaining, and to take part in strikes and other forms of concerted activity in support of their demands." However, many states hold to the principle of at-will employment, which says an employee can be fired for any or no reason, without warning and without recourse, unless violation of State or Federal civil rights laws can be proven. In 2011, 11.8% of U.S. workers were members of labor unions with 37% of public sector (government) workers in unions while only 6.9% of private sector workers were union members.

, U.S. workers worked longer hours on average than any other industrialized country, having surpassed Japan. Info published in 2007 showed U.S. workers rank high in terms of production.

, the United States' maternity leave policy is distinct from other industrialized countries for its relative scarcity of benefits. The length of protected maternity leave ranks 20th out of the 21 high-income countries. Moreover, most foreign wealthy nations provide some form of wage compensation for the leave of absence; the United States is the only one of these 21 countries that does not offer such paid leave.

In 2014, the United States received a poor grade of "4" on the ITUC's Global Rights Index, which ranks the worst places in the world for workers' rights, with "1" being the best and "5" the worst. 

In 2014, the United States was considered a "medium risk" country for child labor according to Maplecroft's 2014 Child Labor Index.

In 2015, the United States and Papua New Guinea were reported to be the only countries in the world that did not guarantee paid maternal leave by law.

Health care

The Universal Declaration of Human Rights, adopted by the United Nations in 1948, states that "everyone has the right to a standard of living adequate for the health and well-being of oneself and one's family, including food, clothing, housing, and medical care." In addition, the Principles of Medical Ethics of the American Medical Association require medical doctors to respect the human rights of the patient, including that of providing medical treatment when it is needed. Americans' rights in health care are regulated by the US Patients' Bill of Rights.

Unlike most other industrialized nations, the United States does not offer most of its citizens subsidized health care. The United States Medicaid program provides subsidized coverage to some categories of individuals and families with low incomes and resources, including children, pregnant women, and very low-income people with disabilities (higher-earning people with disabilities do not qualify for Medicaid, although they do qualify for Medicare). However, according to Medicaid's own documents, "the Medicaid program does not provide health care services, even for very poor people, unless they are in one of the designated eligibility groups."

Nonetheless, some states offer subsidized health insurance to broader populations. Coverage is subsidized for persons age 65 and over, or who meet other special criteria through Medicare. Every person with a permanent disability, both young and old, is inherently entitled to Medicare health benefits — a fact not all disabled US citizens are aware of. However, just like every other Medicare recipient, a disabled person finds that his or her Medicare benefits only cover up to 80% of what the insurer considers reasonable charges in the U.S. medical system, and that the other 20% plus the difference in the reasonable amount and the actual charge must be paid by other means (typically supplemental, privately held insurance plans, or cash out of the person's own pocket). Therefore, even the Medicare program is not truly national health insurance or universal health care the way most of the rest of the industrialized world understands it.

The Emergency Medical Treatment and Active Labor Act of 1986, an unfunded mandate, mandates that no person may ever be denied emergency services regardless of ability to pay, citizenship, or immigration status. The Emergency Medical Treatment and Labor Act has been criticized by the American College of Emergency Physicians as an unfunded mandate.

46.6 million residents, or 15.9 percent, were without health insurance coverage in 2005. This number includes about 10 million non-citizens, millions more who are eligible for Medicaid but never applied, and 18 million with annual household incomes above $50,000. According to a study led by the Johns Hopkins Children's Center, uninsured children who are hospitalized are 60% more likely to die than children who are covered by health insurance.

Justice system
The Fourth, Fifth, Sixth, and Eighth amendments to the United States Constitution (each part of the Bill of Rights), as well as the Fourteenth amendment, ensure that criminal defendants have significant procedural rights. The incorporation of the Bill of Rights has extended these constitutional protections to the state and local levels of law enforcement. The United States also possesses a system of judicial review over government action.

Punishment

Death penalty

Capital punishment is a legal penalty in the United States, currently used by 23 states, the federal government, and the military. , there have been 1,517 executions in the United States since 1976 (when the death penalty was reinstated after it had been effectively invalidated as a punishment by a 1972 Supreme Court ruling). The United States is one of 55 countries worldwide that uses the death penalty, and was the first to develop lethal injection as a method of execution. Among the 56 countries categorized as 'Very high' on the Human Development Index, it is one of only 12 that retain the death penalty (the others being Singapore, Japan, the United Arab Emirates, Saudi Arabia, Bahrain, Oman, Belarus, Kuwait, Qatar, Malaysia, and Taiwan). Among the world's most economically and politically powerful countries, it is one of the few who utilize capital punishment. In 2011, for instance, it was the only country in the G8 that carried out executions, and was among only three countries in the G20 (along with China and Saudi Arabia) that carried out executions. Of the 56 members states of the Organization for Security and Cooperation in Europe, the United States and Belarus were the only two that carried out executions in 2011.

The vast majority of executions are carried out by state governments, largely as a result of the federal political structure of the United States, in which most crimes are prosecuted by state governments rather than the federal government. Capital punishment is heavily concentrated among several states, with Texas overwhelmingly leading in number of executions at 569 between 1976 and 2020, followed by Virginia with 113 executions, and Oklahoma with 112. The disparity is particularly stark when broken down by county: since 1976, only 2% of counties have been responsible for more than half of all executions. As of January 25, 2008, the death penalty has been abolished in the District of Columbia and fourteen states, mainly in the Northeast and Midwest.

The death penalty has a complex legal history. While modern critics have challenged capital punishment on grounds that it violates the Eighth Amendment's ban on the use of "cruel and unusual punishment", the United States Supreme Court has held that it does not. At the time of the ratification of the Bill of Rights, societal moral standards did not hold the death penalty was "cruel and unusual", so it was used throughout early American history. However, the death penalty was temporarily halted by the Supreme Court on Eighth Amendment grounds from 1972 to 1976. In 1958, the United States Supreme Court ruled in Trop v. Dulles that the Eighth Amendment "must draw its meaning from the evolving standards of decency". This opened the way to the 1972 US Supreme Court case Furman v. Georgia , which found that the imposition of the death penalty at the states' discretion constituted cruel and unusual punishment in violation of the Eighth Amendment to the United States Constitution, with the Court stating that the death penalty had been applied in a "harsh, freakish, and arbitrary" manner. This ruling was preceded by the Supreme Court of California's ruling in California v. Anderson 64 Cal.2d 633, 414 P.2d 366 (Cal. 1972), which classified capital punishment as cruel and unusual and outlawed the use of capital punishment in California (however, this was reversed the same year through a ballot initiative, Proposition 17). However, the death penalty was ultimately reinstated nationally in 1976 after the US Supreme Court rulings Gregg v. Georgia, Jurek v. Texas, and Proffitt v. Florida, . Further refinements have been made to death penalty since then, with a ruling on March 1, 2005, by the Supreme Court in Roper v. Simmons prohibiting the execution of people who committed their crimes when they were under the age of 18 (between 1990 and 2005, Amnesty International recorded 19 executions in the United States for crimes committed by juveniles). In international law, it has been argued that the United States may be in violation of international human rights treaties in its use of the death penalty. In 1998, the UN special rapporteur recommended to a committee of the UN General Assembly that the United States be found to be in violation of Article 6 of the International Covenant on Civil and Political Rights with regards to the death penalty, and called for an immediate capital punishment moratorium. The recommendation of the special rapporteur, however, is not legally binding under international law and in this case the UN did not act upon the lawyer's recommendation.

Capital punishment within the United States is controversial. Death penalty opponents consider it "inhumane", criticize it for its irreversibility, and assert that it is ineffective as a deterrent against crime, pointing to several studies which show it has little deterring effect on crime (though this point is controversial as studies have conflicted in their conclusions on the effectiveness of the death penalty as a deterrent). Human rights organizations have been particularly critical of it, with Amnesty International, for example, stating that "the death penalty is the ultimate, irreversible denial of human rights." Notably, the European Union, in accordance with its official policy of attempting to achieve global abolition of the death penalty, has been vocal in its criticism of the death penalty in the US and has submitted amicus curiae briefs in a number of important US court cases related to capital punishment. The American Bar Association also sponsors a project aimed at abolishing the death penalty in the United States, criticizing the US's execution of minors and the mentally disabled and arguing that the US fails to adequately protect the rights of the innocent.

Some opponents criticize the over-representation of black people on death row as evidence of the unequal racial application of the death penalty. In McCleskey v. Kemp, for example, it was alleged the capital sentencing process was administered in a racially discriminatory manner in violation of the Equal Protection Clause of the Fourteenth Amendment. This over-representation is not limited to capital offenses—in 1992, at a time when black people accounted for 12% of the US population, about 34% of prison inmates were from this group. Furthermore, in 2003 Amnesty International reported those who kill whites are more likely to be executed than those who kill blacks, citing that of the 845 people executed since 1977 eighty percent were put to death for killing whites and 13 percent were executed for killing blacks, even though blacks and whites are murdered in almost equal numbers. The extent of racism in this is, however, disputed—black people also commit crimes at a rate disproportionate to their representation in the population and over half of homicides where the race of the offender is known were perpetuated by black people.

Solitary confinement

The United Nations estimates there are about 80,000 prisoners in solitary confinement in the U.S., 12,000 of whom are in California. The use of solitary confinement has drawn criticism and is increasingly viewed as a form of torture because of the psychological harm it causes. The United Nations Special Rapporteur on torture, Juan E. Méndez, has requested that the United States stop holding prisoners in solitary confinement, as "it often causes mental and physical suffering or humiliation, amounting to cruel, inhuman or degrading treatment or punishment, and if the resulting pain or sufferings are severe, solitary confinement even amounts to torture." In a severe example, Herman Wallace and Albert Woodfox, two prisoners at the Angola prison in Louisiana, have each spent more than 40 years in solitary confinement.

Sex offender registries

The NGO Human Rights Watch has stated that there are human rights issues created by the current sex offender registration laws, and that they believe that the burden of being publicly listed as a sex offender, combined with the onerous restrictions placed on former offenders and their family members, are serious human rights violations. They have criticized the over-breadth of the registration requirements, which tend to treat all offenders the same regardless of the nature of the offense and without accounting the risk of future re-offending, as well as the application of such laws to juvenile offenders, consensual teenage sex, prostitution, consensual teenage sexting, and exposing oneself as prank. The ACLU and advocacy group RSOL also believe that measures against sex offenders are inhumane and that current legislation violates the constitutional rights of those with a legal obligation to register. Both organizations have challenged elements of the registration laws in court. By comparison, the European Court of Human Rights has found that indefinite placement on the United Kingdom sex offender registry, which is not available to the general public, is incompatible with an offender's right to privacy if the person has no right to judicial review.

Prison system

International and domestic human rights groups, civil rights organizations, and social critics have criticized the United States for violating fundamental human rights through the use of disproportionately heavy penalties compared to many other countries, overly long prison sentences, over-reliance on police control, excessive control of individual behavior, and societal control of disadvantaged groups through a harsh police and criminal justice system. Human Rights Watch, for instance, has argued that "the extraordinary rate of incarceration in the United States wreaks havoc on individuals, families and communities, and saps the strength of the nation as a whole."

The United States has been criticized for its large prison population, with more than 2.2 million people in prisons or jails. It has the world's highest incarceration rate,  imprisoning roughly 1 out of every 136 Americans (737 per 100,000 people) and disproportionately imprisoning racial minorities and those from the lowest socioeconomic backgrounds. In particular, The United States has been criticized for incarcerating a large number of non-violent and victim-less offenders. Half of all persons incarcerated under State jurisdiction were convicted of non-violent offenses and 20 percent for drug offenses, mostly the possession of cannabis. Marijuana legalization and decriminalization is seen as a step of progress in decreasing the prison population. Other non-violent offenses which carry extremely long prison sentences in the United States include fraud and other acts of corruption, offenses relating to child pornography, and contempt of court.

The United States also has a high rate of youth imprisonment, with many held in the same prisons as adults. According to The National Council on Crime and Delinquency, since 1990 the incarceration of youth in adult jails has increased 208%. They found that juveniles were often incarcerated awaiting trial for up to two years, subjected to the same treatment as adult inmates, and were at greater risk of assault, abuse, or death. The length of prison sentences in the United States is widely criticized in other countries and is believed to be the biggest contributor to the country's large prison population. The length of the average prison sentences in the United States tends to exceed those in other developed countries. The United States is currently the country with the most life sentences, most of which are life without parole (LWOP). Mandatory minimum sentences and three-strikes laws are probably the largest contributors to the country's frequency of life imprisonment. It is estimated that 35% of federal US prisoners are older than age 60, many of whom were younger than 30 at the time of sentencing.

The US also has a large number of foreign nationals in US prisons, with 21% of all federal inmates in 2017 being non-citizens or non-nationals. Additionally, the US Justice Department rarely approves extraditions of foreign prisoners to their home countries, and most are deported after serving their sentences rather than before their trials. This is seen as a huge contributor to prison overcrowding, especially in California, Arizona, and Texas. This goes hand-in-hand with the US immigration policies, which have also been criticized by human rights groups.

Tolerance of serious sexual abuse and rape in United States prisons is also an area of concern to human rights watchers. Human Rights Watch, for instance, raised concerns with prisoner rape and medical care for inmates. In a survey of 1,788 male inmates in Midwestern prisons by Prison Journal, about 21% claimed they had been coerced or pressured into sexual activity during their incarceration and 7% claimed that they had been raped in their current facility.

The United States has also been widely criticized for its attitude towards parole and incarceration alternatives. There is no parole in the federal prison system, which has drawn international outrage from human rights groups and is believed to be a major contributor to prison overcrowding. In addition, 16 states have no parole in their prison systems. Parole is rarely granted where it is allowed, and the United States is the only country that currently has juveniles serving life sentences without parole. The United States has also been heavily criticized for having few or no alternatives to incarceration. Probation, fines, and community service are extremely rarely issued instead of prison time.

Police brutality

In a 1999 report, Amnesty International said it had "documented patterns of ill-treatment across the U.S., including police beatings, unjustified shootings and the use of dangerous restraint techniques."
According to a 1998 Human Rights Watch report, incidents of police use of excessive force had occurred in cities throughout the U.S., and this behavior goes largely unchecked. An article in USA Today reports that in 2006, 96% of cases referred to the U.S. Justice Department for prosecution by investigative agencies were declined. In 2005, 98% were declined. In 2001, The New York Times reported that the U.S. government is unable or unwilling to collect statistics showing the precise number of people killed by the police or the prevalence of the use of excessive force.
From 1999 to 2005, at least 148 people have died in the United States and Canada after being shocked with Tasers by police officers, according to a 2005 ACLU report.
In one case, a handcuffed suspect was tasered nine times by a police officer before dying, and six of those taserings occurred within less than three minutes. The officer was fired and faced the possibility of criminal charges.

On June 2, 2020, George Floyd's official post-mortem report declared the cause of death as asphyxia (lack of oxygen) due to a compression on his neck and back. It also found that the death was a homicide, a statement from the family's legal team said.

On June 23, 2020, a report from the University of Chicago Law School claimed that law enforcement policies in the police departments of 20 largest cities in the United States failed to meet even basic standards under international human rights guidelines. The law enforcement forces are authorized to commit ‘state-sanctioned violence’ without significant reform.

The use of strip searches and cavity searches by law enforcement agencies and in the prison system has raised human rights concerns.

The practice of taking an arrested person on a perp walk, often handcuffed, through a public place at some point after the arrest, creating an opportunity for the media to take photographs and video of the event has raised civil and human rights concerns.

Racial discrimination
Human rights organizations, civil rights groups, academics, journalists, and other critics have argued that the US justice system exhibits racial biases that harm minority groups, particularly African Americans. There are significant racial disparities within the United States prison population, with black individuals making up 38.2% of the federal prison population in 2020 despite accounting for only 13.4% of the total population. Studies have also found that black people, as well as other minority groups, are shot and killed by the police at higher rates than white people, tend to receive harsher punishments than white people, are more likely to be charged for drug crimes despite consuming drugs at similar rates as white people, are at higher lifetime risk of being killed by police than white people, are more likely to be stopped by police while driving, and are more likely to be arrested during a police stop. As the Sentencing Project said in their report to the United Nations:
African Americans are more likely than white Americans to be arrested; once arrested, they are more likely to be convicted; and once convicted, they are more likely to experience lengthy prison sentences.

The cause of this is disputed. There is a widespread belief among the American public that racial discrimination by the police is a persistent problem, and many academics and journalists assert that systemic racism, as well as a number of factors like concentrated poverty and higher rates of substandard housing (which has also led to greater rates of lead poisoning among African Americans) that they argue arise out of past racial segregation or other forms of historical oppression, contribute to the racial disparities. Some—particularly conservative political commentators—however, allege that the disparities arise primarily out of greater rates of criminal activity among black people, and point to studies that have found little evidence that anti-black racism causes disparities in altercations with the police.

Procedural concerns
There have been a number of criticisms over certain legal procedures. The National Association of Criminal Defense Lawyers and Human Rights Watch have, for instance, argued that there exists a "trial penalty"—a penalty for electing to go to trial that arises from the significant discrepancy between the punishment a defendant would receive by waiving the right to trial and accepting a plea bargain compared to the punishment they might receive at trial—which they argue abridges the right to trial guaranteed by the Sixth Amendment to the United States Constitution. There has also been significant criticism over qualified immunity, a judicial precedent that grants government officials—including police officers—significant immunity from civil suits. Critics have argued that qualified immunity makes it excessively difficult to sue public officials for misconduct, including civil rights violations; this has been implicated in particular for enabling police brutality.

There has also been criticism of police department hiring practices. Despite safeguards in place around recruitment, some police departments have hired officers who had histories of poor performance or misconduct in other departments, an issue known as hiring "gypsy cops".

Inhumane treatment and torture of captured non-U.S. citizens

International and U.S. law prohibits torture and other acts of cruel, inhuman, or degrading treatment or punishment of any person in custody in all circumstances, especially in a state of armed conflict. However, the United States Government has categorized a large number of people as unlawful combatants, a classification which denies the privileges of prisoner of war (POW) designation of the Geneva Conventions.

Certain practices of the United States military and Central Intelligence Agency have been widely condemned domestically and internationally as torture. A fierce debate regarding non-standard interrogation techniques exists within the U.S. civilian and military intelligence community, with no general consensus as to what practices under what conditions are acceptable.

Abuse of prisoners is considered a crime in the United States Uniform Code of Military Justice. According to a January 2006 Human Rights First report, there were 45 suspected or confirmed homicides while in U.S. custody in Iraq and Afghanistan; "Certainly 8, as many as 12, people were tortured to death."

Abu Ghraib prison abuse

In 2004, photos showing humiliation and abuse of prisoners were leaked from Abu Ghraib prison, causing a political and media scandal in the US. Forced humiliation of the detainees included, but was not limited to: forced nudity; rape; human piling of nude detainees; masturbation; eating food out of toilets; crawling on hands and knees while American soldiers sat on their backs, sometimes requiring them to bark like dogs; and hooking up electrical wires to fingers, toes, and penises. Bertrand Ramcharan, the acting UN High Commissioner for Human Rights, stated that while the removal of Saddam Hussein represented "a major contribution to human rights in Iraq" and that the United States had condemned the conduct at Abu Ghraib and pledged to bring violators to justice, "willful killing, torture and inhuman treatment" represented a grave breach of international law and "might be designated as war crimes by a competent tribunal".

In addition to the acts of humiliation, there were more violent claims, such as American soldiers sodomizing detainees (including an event involving an underage boy), an incident in which a phosphoric light was broken and the chemicals poured on a detainee, repeated beatings, and threats of death. Six military personnel were charged with prisoner abuse in the Abu Ghraib torture and prisoner abuse scandal. The harshest sentence was handed out to Charles Graner, who received a 10-year sentence to be served in a military prison and a demotion to private; the other offenders received lesser sentences.

In their report The Road to Abu Ghraib, Human Rights Watch states:

The [Bush] administration effectively sought to re-write the Geneva Conventions of 1949 to eviscerate many of their most important protections. These include the rights of all detainees in an armed conflict to be free from humiliating and degrading treatment, as well as from torture and other forms of coercive interrogation...[M]ethods included holding detainees in painful stress positions, depriving them of sleep and light for prolonged periods, exposing them to extremes of heat, cold, noise and light, hooding, and depriving them of all clothing...Concern for the basic rights of persons taken into custody in Afghanistan and Iraq did not factor into the Bush administration's agenda. The administration largely dismissed expressions of concern for their treatment, from both within the government and without.

Enhanced interrogation and waterboarding

On February 6, 2008, the CIA director General Michael Hayden stated that the CIA had used waterboarding on three prisoners during 2002 and 2003, namely Khalid Shaikh Mohammed, Abu Zubayda and Abd al-Rahim al-Nashiri.

The June 21, 2004, issue of Newsweek stated that the Bybee memo, a 2002 legal memorandum drafted by former OLC lawyer John Yoo that described what sort of interrogation tactics against suspected terrorists or terrorist affiliates the Bush administration would consider legal, was "... prompted by CIA questions about what to do with a top Qaeda captive, Abu Zubaydah, who had turned uncooperative ... and was drafted after White House meetings convened by George W. Bush's chief counsel, Alberto Gonzales, along with Defense Department general counsel William Haynes and David Addington, Vice President Dick Cheney's counsel, who discussed specific interrogation techniques," citing "a source familiar with the discussions." Amongst the methods they found acceptable was waterboarding.

In November 2005, ABC News reported that former CIA agents claimed that the CIA engaged in a modern form of waterboarding, along with five other "enhanced interrogation techniques", against suspected members of al Qaeda.

UN High Commissioner for Human Rights, Louise Arbour, stated on the subject of waterboarding "I would have no problems with describing this practice as falling under the prohibition of torture," and that violators of the UN Convention Against Torture should be prosecuted under the principle of universal jurisdiction.

Bent Sørensen, Senior Medical Consultant to the International Rehabilitation Council for Torture Victims and former member of the United Nations Committee Against Torture has said:

It's a clear-cut case: Waterboarding can without any reservation be labeled as torture. It fulfils all of the four central criteria that according to the United Nations Convention Against Torture (UNCAT) defines an act of torture. First, when water is forced into your lungs in this fashion, in addition to the pain you are likely to experience an immediate and extreme fear of death. You may even suffer a heart attack from the stress or damage to the lungs and brain from inhalation of water and oxygen deprivation. In other words there is no doubt that waterboarding causes severe physical and/or mental suffering – one central element in the UNCAT's definition of torture. In addition the CIA's waterboarding clearly fulfills the three additional definition criteria stated in the Convention for a deed to be labeled torture, since it is 1) done intentionally, 2) for a specific purpose and 3) by a representative of a state – in this case the US.

Both Human Rights Watch and Amnesty International have condemned waterboarding as a form of torture, the latter group demanding that former president George W. Bush be prosecuted.

Lt. Gen. Michael D. Maples, the director of the Defense Intelligence Agency, concurred by stating, in a hearing before the Senate Armed Services Committee, that he believes waterboarding violates Common Article 3 of the Geneva Conventions.

The Tokyo War Crimes Tribunal and United Nations War Crimes Commission both defined waterboarding as ill-treatment and torture in the aftermath of World War II.

The CIA director testified that waterboarding has not been used since 2003.

In April 2009, the Obama administration released four memos in which government lawyers from the Bush administration approved tough interrogation methods used against 28 terror suspects. The rough tactics range from waterboarding (simulated drowning) to keeping suspects naked and denying them solid food.

These memos were accompanied by the Justice Department's release of four Bush-era legal opinions covering (in graphic and extensive detail) the interrogation of 14 high-value terror detainees using harsh techniques beyond waterboarding. These additional techniques include keeping detainees in a painful standing position for long periods (Used often, once for 180 hours), using a plastic neck collar to slam detainees into walls, keeping the detainee's cell cold for long periods, beating and kicking the detainee, insects placed in a confinement box (the suspect had a fear of insects), sleep-deprivation, prolonged shackling, and threats to a detainee's family. One of the memos also authorized a method for combining multiple techniques.

Details from the memos also included the number of times that techniques such as waterboarding were used. A footnote said that one detainee was waterboarded 83 times in one month, while another was waterboarded 183 times in a month.
 This may have gone beyond even what was allowed by the CIA's own directives, which limit waterboarding to 12 times a day.
The Fox News website carried reports from an unnamed U.S. official who claimed that these were the number of pourings, not the number of sessions.

Physicians for Human Rights has accused the Bush administration of conducting illegal human experiments and unethical medical research during interrogations of suspected terrorists. The group has suggested this activity was a violation of the standards set by the Nuremberg Trials.

Guantánamo Bay

The United States maintains a detention center at its military base at Guantánamo Bay, Cuba where enemy combatants of the war on terror are held. The detention center has been the source of various controversies regarding the legality of the center and the treatment of detainees. Amnesty International has called the situation "a human rights scandal" in a series of reports. 775 detainees have been brought to Guantánamo. Of these, many have been released without charge.  The United States assumed territorial control over Guantánamo Bay under the 1903 Cuban–American Treaty of Relations, which granted the United States a perpetual lease of the area. United States, by virtue of its complete jurisdiction and control, maintains "de facto" sovereignty over this territory, while Cuba retained ultimate sovereignty over the territory. The current government of Cuba regards the U.S. presence in Guantánamo as illegal and insists the Cuban-American Treaty was obtained by threat of force in violation of international law.

A delegation of UN Special Rapporteurs to Guantanamo Bay claimed that interrogation techniques used in the detention center amount to degrading treatment in violation of the ICCPR and the Convention Against Torture.

In 2005, Amnesty International expressed alarm at the erosion in civil liberties since the 9/11 attacks. According to Amnesty International:

The Guantánamo Bay detention camp has become a symbol of the United States administration's refusal to put human rights and the rule of law at the heart of its response to the atrocities of September 11, 2001. It has become synonymous with the United States executive's pursuit of unfettered power, and has become firmly associated with the systematic denial of human dignity and resort to cruel, inhuman or degrading treatment that has marked the U.S.'s detentions and interrogations in the "war on terror".

Amnesty International also condemned the Guantánamo facility as "... the gulag of our times," which raised heated conversation in the United States. The purported legal status of "unlawful combatants" in those nations currently holding detainees under that name has been the subject of criticism by other nations and international human rights institutions including Human Rights Watch and the International Committee of the Red Cross. The ICRC, in response to the U.S.-led military campaign in Afghanistan, published a paper on the subject. HRW cites two sergeants and a captain accusing U.S. troops of torturing prisoners in Iraq and Afghanistan.

However, former Republican governor Mike Huckabee, for example, has stated that the conditions in Guantánamo are better than most U.S. prisons.

The U.S. government argues that even if detainees were entitled to POW status, they would not have the right to lawyers, access to the courts to challenge their detention, or the opportunity to be released prior to the end of hostilities—and that nothing in the Third Geneva Convention provides POWs such rights, and POWs in past wars—such as Japanese prisoners of war in World War II—have generally not been given these rights. The U.S. Supreme Court ruled in Hamdan v. Rumsfeld on June 29, 2006, that they were entitled to the minimal protections listed under Common Article 3 of the Geneva Conventions. Following this, on July 7, 2006, the Department of Defense issued an internal memo stating that prisoners would in the future be entitled to protection under Common Article 3.

Extraordinary rendition

In a process known as extraordinary rendition, foreign nationals have been captured and abducted outside of the United States and transferred to secret US-administered detention facilities, sometimes being held incommunicado for months or years. According to The New Yorker, "The most common destinations for rendered suspects are Egypt, Morocco, Syria, and Jordan, all of which have been cited for human-rights violations by the State Department, and are known to torture suspects."

Notable cases
In November 2001, Yaser Esam Hamdi, a U.S. citizen, was captured by Afghan Northern Alliance forces in Konduz, Afghanistan, amongst hundreds of surrendering Taliban fighters and was transferred into U.S. custody. The U.S. government alleged that Hamdi was there fighting for the Taliban, while Hamdi, through his father, has claimed that he was merely there as a relief worker and was mistakenly captured. Hamdi was transferred into CIA custody and transferred to the Guantanamo Bay Naval Base, but when it was discovered that he was a U.S. citizen, he was transferred to naval brig in Norfolk, Virginia and then he was transferred brig in Charleston, South Carolina. The Bush Administration identified him as an unlawful combatant and denied him access to an attorney or the court system, despite his Fifth Amendment right to due process. In 2002 Hamdi's father filed a habeas corpus petition, the Judge ruled in Hamdi's favor and required he be allowed a public defender; however, on appeal the decision was reversed. In 2004, in the case of Hamdi v. Rumsfeld the U.S. Supreme court reversed the dismissal of a habeas corpus petition and ruled detainees who are U.S. citizens must have the ability to challenge their detention before an impartial judge.

In December 2004, Khalid El-Masri, a German citizen, was apprehended by Macedonian authorities when traveling to Skopje because his name was similar to Khalid al-Masri, an alleged mentor to the al-Qaeda Hamburg cell. After being held in a motel in Macedonia for over three weeks he was transferred to the CIA and extradited to Afghanistan. While held in Afghanistan, El-Masri claims he was sodomized, beaten, and repeatedly interrogated about alleged terrorist ties. After being in custody for five months, Condoleezza Rice learned of his detention and ordered his release. El-Masri was released at night on a desolate road in Albania, without apology or funds to return home. He was intercepted by Albanian guards, who believed he was a terrorist due to his haggard and unkept appearance. He was subsequently reunited with his wife who had returned to her family in Lebanon with their children because she thought her husband had abandoned them. Using isotope analysis, scientists at the Bavarian archive for geology in Munich analyzed his hair and verified that he was malnourished during his disappearance.

In 2007, U.S. President Bush signed an Executive order banning the use of torture in the CIA's interrogation program.

According to the Human Rights Watch report (September 2012) the United States government during the U.S. President Bush republican administration "waterboarding" tortured opponents of Muammar Gaddafi during interrogations, then transferred them to mistreatment in Libya.
President Barack Obama has denied water torture.

Unethical human experimentation in the United States

Well-known cases include: 

 Albert Kligman's dermatology experiments
 Greenberg v. Miami Children's Hospital Research Institute
 Henrietta Lacks
 Human radiation experiments 
 Jesse Gelsinger
 Medical Experimentation on Black Americans
 Milgram experiment
 Monster Study
 Moore v. Regents of the University of California
 Plutonium injections
 Project MKULTRA
 Project MKOFTEN
 Radioactive iodine experiments
 Stanford prison experiment
 Surgical removal of body parts to try to improve mental health
 Tuskegee syphilis experiment
 Willowbrook State School

International comparison
According to Canadian historian Michael Ignatieff, during and after the Cold War, the United States placed greater emphasis than other nations on human rights as part of its foreign policy, awarded foreign aid to facilitate human rights progress, and annually assessed the human rights records of other national governments.

Support
The U.S. Department of State publishes a yearly report "Supporting Human Rights and Democracy: The U.S. Record" in compliance with a 2002 law that requires the department to report on actions taken by the U.S. Government to encourage respect for human rights. It also publishes yearly "Country Reports on Human Rights Practices." In 2006 the United States created a "Human Rights Defenders Fund" and "Freedom Awards." The "Ambassadorial Roundtable Series", created in 2006, are informal discussions between newly confirmed U.S. Ambassadors and human rights and democracy non-governmental organizations. The United States also support democracy and human rights through several other tools.

The "Human Rights and Democracy Achievement Award" recognizes the exceptional achievement of officers of foreign affairs agencies posted abroad.
In 2006 the award went to Joshua Morris of the embassy in Mauritania who recognized necessary democracy and human rights improvements in Mauritania and made democracy promotion one of his primary responsibilities. He persuaded the Government of Mauritania to re-open voter registration lists to an additional 85,000 citizens, which includes a significant number of Afro-Mauritanian minority individuals. He also organized and managed the largest youth-focused democracy project in Mauritania in 5 years.
Nathaniel Jensen of the embassy in Vietnam was runner-up. He successfully advanced the human rights agenda on several fronts, including organizing the resumption of a bilateral Human Rights Dialogue, pushing for the release of Vietnam's prisoners of concern, and dedicating himself to improving religion freedom in northern Vietnam.

Under legislation by congress, the United States declared that countries utilizing child soldiers may no longer be eligible for US military assistance, in an attempt to end this practice.

Treaties ratified
See also International Covenant on Civil and Political Rights - United States

The U.S. has signed and ratified the following human rights treaties:
 International Covenant on Civil and Political Rights (ICCPR) (ratified with 5 reservations, 5 understandings, and 4 declarations.)
 Optional protocol on the involvement of children in armed conflict
 International Convention on the Elimination of All Forms of Racial Discrimination
 Convention against Torture and Other Cruel, Inhuman or Degrading Treatment or Punishment
 Protocol relating to the Status of Refugees
 Optional Protocol to the Convention on the Rights of the Child on the Sale of Children, Child Prostitution and Child Pornography

Non-binding documents voted for:
 Universal Declaration of Human Rights

International Bill of Rights
See also International Covenant on Civil and Political Rights - United States

The International Covenant on Civil and Political Rights (ICCPR) and the International Covenant on Economic, Social and Cultural Rights (ICESCR) are the legal treaties that enshrine the rights outlined in the Universal Declaration of Human Rights. Together, and along with the first and second optional protocols of the ICCPR they constitute the International bill of rights The US has not ratified the ICESCR or either of the optional protocols of the ICCPR.

The US's ratification of the ICCPR was done with five reservations – or limits – on the treaty, 5 understandings and 4 declarations. Among these is the rejection of sections of the treaty that prohibit capital punishment. Included in the Senate's ratification was the declaration that "the provisions of Article 1 through 27 of the Covenant are not self-executing", and in a Senate Executive Report stated that the declaration was meant to "clarify that the Covenant will not create a private cause of action in U.S. Courts." This way of ratifying the treaty was criticized as incompatible with the Supremacy Clause by Louis Henkin.

As a reservation that is "incompatible with the object and purpose" of a treaty is void as a matter of international law, Vienna Convention on the Law of Treaties, art. 19, 1155 U.N.T.S. 331 (entered into force January 27, 1980) (specifying conditions under which signatory States can offer "reservations"), there is some issue as to whether the non-self-execution declaration is even legal under domestic law. At any rate, the United States is but a signatory in name only.

International Criminal Court

The U.S. has not ratified the Rome Statute of the International Criminal Court (ICC), which was drafted for prosecuting individuals above the authority of national courts in the event of accusations of genocide, crimes against humanity, war crimes, and crime of aggression. Nations that have accepted the Rome Statute can defer to the jurisdiction of the ICC or must surrender their jurisdiction when ordered.

The US rejected the Rome Statute after its attempts to include the nation of origin as a party in international proceedings failed, and after certain requests were not met, including recognition of gender issues, "rigorous" qualifications for judges, viable definitions of crimes, protection of national security information that might be sought by the court, and jurisdiction of the UN Security Council to halt court proceedings in special cases. Since the passage of the statute, the US has actively encouraged nations around the world to sign "bilateral immunity agreements" prohibiting the surrender of US personnel before the ICC and actively attempted to undermine the Rome Statute of the International Criminal Court. The US Congress also passed a law, American Service-Members' Protection Act (ASPA) authorizing the use of military force to free any US personnel that are brought before the court rather than its own court system. Human Rights Watch criticized the United States for removing itself from the Statute.

Judge Richard Goldstone, the first chief prosecutor at The Hague war crimes tribunal on the former Yugoslavia, echoed these sentiments saying:

I think it is a very backwards step. It is unprecedented which I think to an extent smacks of pettiness in the sense that it is not going to affect in any way the establishment of the international criminal court ... The US have really isolated themselves and are putting themselves into bed with the likes of China, the Yemen and other undemocratic countries.

While the US has maintained that it will "bring to justice those who commit genocide, crimes against humanity and war crimes," even though the U.S.A. has supported many genocides, for example the Indonesian genocide in the 1960s; its primary objections to the Rome Statute have revolved around the issues of jurisdiction and process. A US ambassador for War Crimes Issues to the UN Security Council said to the US Senate Foreign Relations Committee that because the Rome Statute requires only one nation to submit to the ICC, and that this nation can be the country in which an alleged crime was committed rather than defendant's country of origin, U.S. military personnel and US foreign peaceworkers in more than 100 countries could be tried in international court without the consent of the US. The ambassador states that "most atrocities are committed internally and most internal conflicts are between warring parties of the same nationality, the worst offenders of international humanitarian law can choose never to join the treaty and be fully insulated from its reach absent a Security Council referral. Yet multinational peacekeeping forces operating in a country that has joined the treaty can be exposed to the court's jurisdiction even if the country of the individual peacekeeper has not joined the treaty."

Other treaties not signed or signed but not ratified
Where the signature is subject to ratification, acceptance or approval, the signature does not establish the consent to be bound. However, it is a means of authentication and expresses the willingness of the signatory state to continue the treaty-making process. The signature qualifies the signatory state to proceed to ratification, acceptance or approval. It also creates an obligation to refrain, in good faith, from acts that would defeat the object and the purpose of the treaty.

The U.S. has not ratified the following international human rights treaties:
 First Optional Protocol to the International Covenant on Civil and Political Rights (ICCPR)
 Second Optional Protocol to the International Covenant on Civil and Political Rights, aiming at the abolition of the death penalty
 Optional Protocol to CEDAW
 Optional Protocol to the Convention against Torture
 Convention relating to the Status of Refugees (1951)
 Convention Relating to the Status of Stateless Persons (1954)
 Convention on the Reduction of Statelessness (1961)
 International Convention on the Protection of the Rights of All Migrant Workers and Members of their Families

The US has signed but not ratified the following treaties:

 Convention on the Elimination of All Forms of Discrimination against Women (CEDAW)
 Convention on the Rights of the Child (CRC)
International Covenant on Economic, Social and Cultural Rights
Convention on the Rights of Persons with Disabilities

Non-binding documents voted against:
 Declaration on the Rights of Indigenous Peoples in September 2007.

Inter-American human rights system
The US is a signatory to the 1948 American Declaration of the Rights and Duties of Man and has signed but not ratified the 1969 American Convention on Human Rights. It is a member of Inter-American Convention on the Granting of Political Rights to Women (1948). It does not accept the adjudicatory jurisdiction of the Costa Rica-based Inter-American Court of Human Rights.

The US has not ratified any of the other regional human rights treaties of the Organization of American States, which include:

 Protocol to the American Convention on Human Rights to Abolish the Death Penalty (1990)
 Additional Protocol to the American Convention on Human Rights in the Area of Economic, Social and Cultural Rights
 Inter-American Convention to Prevent and Punish Torture (1985)
 Inter-American Convention on the Prevention, Punishment and Eradication of Violence Against Women (1994)
 Inter-American Convention on Forced Disappearance of Persons (1994)
 Inter-American Convention on the Elimination of All Forms of Discrimination against Persons with Disabilities

Coverage of violations in the media
Studies have found that The New York Times coverage of worldwide human rights violations is seriously biased, predominantly focusing on the human rights violations in nations where there is clear U.S. involvement, while having relatively little coverage of the human rights violations in other nations. Amnesty International's Secretary General Irene Khan explains, "If we focus on the U.S. it's because we believe that the U.S. is a country whose enormous influence and power has to be used constructively ... When countries like the U.S. are seen to undermine or ignore human rights, it sends a very powerful message to others."

Further assessments

The Polity data series generated by the Political Instability Task Force, a U.S. government research project funded by the CIA, rating regime and authority characteristics, covering the years 1800–2018, has given the US 10 points out of 10 for the years 1871–1966 and 1974–2015. The US score declined to 8 in 2016, 2017, and 2018.

According to the Economist Magazines Democracy Index (2016), the US ranks 21 out of 167 nations.   In 2016 and 2017, the United States is classified as a "Flawed Democracy" by Democracy Index and received a score of 8.24 out of 10.00 with respect to civil liberties. This is the first time the United States has been downgraded from a "Full Democracy" to a "Flawed Democracy" since The Economist began publishing the Democracy Index report.

According to the annual Worldwide Press Freedom Index published by Reporters Without Borders, due to journalist harassment and public distrust in mainstream media, the U.S ranked 44 out of 197 countries for press freedom.

According to the annual Corruption Perceptions Index, which was published by Transparency International, the United States ranked 25th out of 180 countries with of 67/100 for political transparency.

According to the annual Privacy International index of 2007, the United States was ranked an "endemic surveillance society", scoring only 1.5 out of 5 privacy points.

According to the annual Democracy Matrix, which is published by the University of Würzburg, the US was a "working democracy" in 2019, which is the highest category in that index, although it is the third-lowest ranking country in that category (36th overall).

According to the Gallup International Millennium Survey, the United States ranked 23rd in citizens' perception of human rights observance when its citizens were asked, "In general, do you think that human rights are being fully respected, partially respected or are they not being respected at all in your country?"

Other issues
In the aftermath of the devastation caused by Hurricane Katrina, criticism by some groups commenting on human rights issues was made regarding the recovery and reconstruction issues26. The Committee, while taking note of the various rules and regulations prohibiting discrimination in the provision of disaster relief and emergency assistance, remains concerned about information that poor people and in particular African-Americans, were disadvantaged by the rescue and evacuation plans implemented when Hurricane Katrina hit the United States of America, and continue to be disadvantaged under the reconstruction plans. (articles 6 and 26) The State party should review its practices and policies to ensure the full implementation of its obligation to protect life and of the prohibition of discrimination, whether direct or indirect, as well as of the United Nations Guiding Principles on Internal Displacement, in the areas of disaster prevention and preparedness, emergency assistance and relief measures. In the aftermath of Hurricane Katrina, it should increase its efforts to ensure that the rights of poor people and in particular African-Americans, are fully taken into consideration in the reconstruction plans with regard to access to housing, education and health care. The Committee wishes to be informed about the results of the inquiries into the alleged failure to evacuate prisoners at the Parish prison, as well as the allegations that New Orleans residents were not permitted by law enforcement officials to cross the Greater New Orleans Bridge to Gretna, Louisiana. See:  The American Civil Liberties Union and the National Prison Project documented mistreatment of the prison population during the flooding, See also:  while United Nations Special Rapporteur Doudou Diène delivered a 2008 report on such issues. The United States was elected in 2009 to sit on the United Nations Human Rights Council (UNHRC), which the U.S. State Department had previously asserted had lost its credibility by its prior stances and lack of safeguards against severe human rights violators taking a seat. In 2006 and 2007, the UNHCR and Martin Scheinin were critical of the United States regard permitting executions by lethal injection, housing children in adult jails, subjecting prisoners to prolonged isolation in supermax prisons, using enhanced interrogation techniques and domestic poverty gaps.Rizvi, Haider. Racial Poverty Gaps in U.S. Amount to Human Rights Violation, Says U.N. Expert . OneWorld.net(published on CommonDreams). November 30, 2005. Retrieved on August 13, 2007.

On 28 October 2020, Amnesty International raised concerns over the condition of human rights in the United States, and decided to monitor and expose the human rights violations related to protests during and after the 3 November United States elections.

On 9 November 2020, during the 3.5 -hour session at the UN's main human rights body, the United States came under scrutiny for the first time in five years, regarding the detention of migrant children and the killings of unarmed Black people during Donald Trump’s tenure. The US critics, including Iran, Syria, Venezuela, Russia and China, raised concerns on the United States human rights records that followed up on an August report about past rights records of the US.

See alsoCriticism of the US human rights recordHuman Rights Record of the United States, report prepared by the People's Republic of China
United States and State terrorismUS Human rights abusesUnethical human experimentation in the United States
Human rights violations by the CIAOrganizations involved in US human rightsPennsylvania Abolition Society
National Organization for Women
US Human Rights NetworkPeople involved in US human rightsSusan B. Anthony
Anthony Benezet
Mary Bonauto
Louis Henkin
Gay McDougall
Gloria SteinemNotable comments on US human rights'''
Four Freedoms, a 1941 speech made by U.S. President Franklin D. Roosevelt
Second Bill of Rights, a list of rights proposed by Roosevelt during his State of the Union Address on January 11, 1944.

 Notes 

References

Further reading

External links
 Human Rights in the US and the International Community , UNL Initiative on Human Rights & Human Diversity siteresearch and study source directed at secondary and post-secondary students
 Freedom in the World 2006: United States  from Freedom House
 Human Rights from United States Department of State
 United States: Human Rights World Report 2006 from Human Rights Watch
 The Most Resonant Human Rights Violations in Certain Countries 2013 from MFA of the Republic of Belarus
United States of America: Death Penalty Worldwide Academic research database on the laws, practice, and statistics of capital punishment for every death penalty country in the world.
With Liberty to Monitor All: How Large-Scale US Surveillance is Harming Journalism, Law, and American Democracy. Human Rights Watch, July 28, 2014.
The disappeared: Chicago police detain Americans at abuse-laden 'black site'. The Guardian.'' 24 February 2015.
 Christopher N.J. Roberts: William H. Fitzpatrick’s Editorials on Human Rights (1949), published by Arbeitskreis Menschenrechte im 20. Jahrhundert, published at "Quellen zur Geschichte der Menschenrechte"
Alston, Philip. (2018) Report of the Special Rapporteur on extreme poverty and human rights on his mission to the United States of America OHCHR.

 
Political repression in the United States
United States